BSK Saint Petersburg was a bandy club in Saint Petersburg, Russia. The club was founded as «Krasnaya Zarya» ("Red Dawn") in 1936 and switched to the name BSK in 2001 for sponsor reasons. The club played one season in the Russian Bandy Super League, the top-tier of Russian bandy, in the 2003/04 season. The home games were played at Stadium Spartak in Saint Petersburg. The club colours were white and blue while the fan club was called "Red Bandy Fans".

The club had to cease its activities in 2005 due to financial problems of the main sponsor.

References

Bandy clubs in Russia
Bandy clubs in the Soviet Union
Sports clubs in Saint Petersburg
Bandy clubs established in 1936
Bandy clubs disestablished in 2005
1936 establishments in Russia
Defunct bandy clubs
2005 disestablishments in Russia